Perileptus areolatus is a species of brown coloured ground beetle in the Trechinae subfamily.

Distribution
The species can be found everywhere in Europe except for Andorra, Finland, Lithuania, Monaco, San Marino and Vatican City. The can also be found in Asia in such countries as Armenia, Azerbaijan, Georgia, Iran, Iraq, Israel, Saudi Arabia, Syria, Turkey, and in African nation of Tunisia and Canary Islands.

Irish distribution
In Ireland the species is found Kerry and Cork provinces.

Habitat
The species lives along riverine shingle.

Threats and status
The species is classified as Nationally Scarce in Great Britain due to the habitat loss. The habitat loss includes the spread of invasive plants such as Himalayan Balsam, pollution, and floods due to engineering and dredging of the banks.

References

External links
Perileptus areolatus on Flickr

Beetles described in 1799
Beetles of North Africa
Beetles of Asia
Beetles of Europe